The Rapaport Price List, informally known as the Rap List or Rap Sheet, is the diamond industry standard for the pricing of diamonds.

History
The first Rapaport Price List was produced by Martin Rapaport, the Rapaport Diamonds Group founder, in 1978.

How it works
The report is updated every week on Thursday, at 11:59pm EST.  The Rapaport Price List is copyrighted and available only to subscribers. Jewelers and diamond merchants use it to set prices for consumers. Consumers should therefore use the report with caution.  These prices are used as the basis for standardization and negotiation of diamond prices around the world. Many of the agreed upon prices in diamond trade are come to from discounts based on the Rapaport Price List.

What is the report based on?
The report is issued in the form of a table and prices diamonds based on their size, color and clarity. The report provides prices for individual diamonds and not diamonds sold in bulk.

How to read the report
Each price list has four separate grids each one containing information for a different carat size for diamonds.  Each grid has the clarity options on the horizontal line and the color options on the vertical line.  In order to calculate the price of a diamond according to the Rapaport Price List, you need to know the size, color and clarity of the diamond.  The price listed based on this information is in hundreds of dollars per carat.

See also
Diamonds as an investment

References

External links

Diamond industry